Krishan Lal Middha is an Indian politician. He was elected to the Haryana Legislative Assembly from Jind, Haryana in the 2019 Haryana Legislative Assembly election as a member of the Bharatiya Janata Party.

References

Living people
Bharatiya Janata Party politicians from Haryana
People from Jind
Year of birth missing (living people)
Haryana MLAs 2019–2024
Haryana MLAs 2014–2019